Ukraine competed at the 2011 World Championships in Athletics from August 27 to September 4 in Daegu, South Korea.

Team selection 

A team of 59 athletes was announced to represent the country in the event.  The team was led by triple jumper Olha Saladuha and the 2008 Olympic Games heptathlon winner Nataliya Dobrynska.  The final team on the entry list comprised the names of 57 athletes.

The following athletes appeared on the preliminary Entry List, but not on the Official Start List of the specific events, resulting in a total number of 55 competitors:

Medalists 

The following competitors from Ukraine won medals at the Championships:

Results

Men 

Decathlon

Women 

Heptathlon

References

External links 

 Championships' web-page on IAAF's web-site

Nations at the 2011 World Championships in Athletics
World Championships in Athletics
Ukraine at the World Championships in Athletics